Batocera una is a species of beetle in the family Cerambycidae. It was described from three female specimens by Adam White in 1858. It is known from the Solomon Islands and Vanuatu.

References

Batocerini
Beetles described in 1858